The Red Hill Mine at Sovereign Hill is a mine in Ballarat East, Victoria, Australia, that was one of the first major mines in the Eureka Stockade. It has tours led by a voice that trails the visitor through the mine. It is 76 steps down and roughly 100 steps across. Another major mine is The Sovereign Hill Quartz Mine which produces quartz.

References 

Mines in Victoria (Australia)